Pseudemoia baudini, also known commonly as Baudin's skink, Baudin's window-eyed skink, and the Bight Coast skink, is a species of lizard in the family Scincidae. The species is endemic to Australia.

Etymology
The specific name, baudini, is in honor of French explorer Nicolas Baudin.

Geographic range
P. baudini is found in the Australian states of South Australia and Western Australia.

Habitat
The preferred natural habitat of P. baudini is shrubland.

Description
P. baudini has paired frontoparietal scales.

Reproduction
P. baudini is viviparous.

References

Further reading
Cogger HG (2014). Reptiles and Amphibians of Australia, Seventh Edition. Clayton, Victoria, Australia: CSIRO Publishing. xxx + 1,033 pp. .
Greer AE (1982). "A new species of Leiolopisma (Lacertilia: Scincidae) from Western Australia, with notes on the biology and relationships of other Australian species". Records of the Australian Museum 34 (12): 549–573. (Leiolopisma baudini, new species, pp. 550–557, Figures 1–3).
Hutchinson MN, Donnellan SC (1992). "Taxonomy and genetic variation in the Australian lizards of the genus Pseudemoia (Scincidae: Lygosominae)". Journal of Natural History 26 (1): 215–264.
Storr GM, Smith LA, Johnstone RE (1999). Lizards of Western Australia. I. Skinks. Revised Edition. Perth: Western Australian Museum. xvi + 291 pp., 36 color plates. .
Wilson S, Swan G (2013). A Complete Guide to Reptiles of Australia, Fourth Edition. Sydney: New Holland Publishers. 522 pp. .

Pseudemoia
Reptiles described in 1982
Skinks of Australia
Endemic fauna of Australia
Taxa named by Allen Eddy Greer
Hampton bioregion